Arroz de lisa (mullet rice) is a traditional Colombian cuisine dish from the Atlantic (Caribbean Sea) coast. It is cooked with mullet, a sea fish found in brackish waters, like those at river mouths.

In addition to the mullet which are usually dried and salted previously, the rice contains vegetables (e.g., onion, ají dulce, onion), and spices (e.g., paprika, cumin, salt, pepper). It is usually served in a leaf with minced chives, accompanied by bollo, avocado salad, and guarapo.

See also

List of rice dishes
Queso costeño
Suero atollabuey
Butifarra Soledeñas
Bollo

References

Colombian cuisine
Latin American rice dishes